Flight 129 may refer to:

Airbus Industrie Flight 129, which crashed on 30 June 1994
Air China Flight 129, which crashed on 15 April 2002

0129